The Inter-Parliamentary Alliance on China (IPAC) is an international, cross-party alliance of parliamentarians from democratic countries focused on relations with the People's Republic of China (PRC), and specifically, the Chinese Communist Party (CCP). It was established on June 4, 2020, on the anniversary of the 1989 Tiananmen Square protests and massacre. The alliance comprises over 100 MPs from the world's democratic legislatures, Ireland becoming the 20th national to join the alliance in February 2021. Each legislature represented takes turns to chair the alliance on a rotating basis. Its purpose is to create a coordinated response to China on global trade, security and human rights.

History

Parliamentarians speaking—and being isolated 

In its founding statement, the alliance stated that "countries that have tried to stand up to Beijing have mostly done so alone — and often at great cost." Many of those who first signed the declaration have been affected by overseas censorship of Chinese issues in recent years. Co-chair Andrew Hastie and fellow member James Paterson were banned from visiting China after meeting with Uyghur dissidents and writing about the threat of China to Australian democracy. Germany's co-chair Michael Brand experienced "massive pressure" to delete comments about Tibet and later had a travel ban imposed on him. Canadian parliamentarians joined the alliance after the CCP restricted imports on some Canadian goods and detained Canadians nationals Michael Spavor and Michael Kovrig as a tit for tat for Canada's arrest of Meng Wanzhou on charges of fraud. Sweden's co-chair Fredrik Malm spoke at a solidarity rally for Hong Kong in September 2019. Some weeks later China's Ambassador to Sweden, Gui Congyou addressed Swedish listeners and said,  "We treat our friends with fine wine, but for our enemies we have shotguns." This type of intimidating language is one of the features of China's new generation of "wolf warrior diplomats." Despite this intimidation, many representatives from the world's democracies wish to maintain their "long-standing concerns over human rights and trade practices".

COVID-19 and Hong Kong 

Two contemporaneous events triggered the formation of the alliance: China's initial attempt to suppress news of what eventually became the COVID-19 pandemic and Beijing's plan to criminalize dissent in the semi-autonomous territory of Hong Kong.

China's "lack of transparency over the COVID-19 pandemic" meant that many democratic nations felt compelled to confront the CCP. When Australia moved to hold China accountable for its actions, or inactions, around the outbreak first detected in Wuhan, China quickly imposed new tariffs on Australian barley and outright bans on some of its beef, then went on to warn Chinese citizens against traveling to the country. Conservative Canadian MP and co-chair, Garnett Genuis said, "We don’t want to be in a situation where individual countries are targeted and isolated one at a time."

Beijing's plans to criminalise dissent, became the final impetus for the new alliance. Baroness Kennedy condemned "unilateral introduction of national security legislation in Hong Kong" Kennedy, a Labour Party member of the House of Lords, would later reach out to form the permanent alliance with Conservative MP Sir Iain Duncan Smith. Joining them came US Republican Senator Marco Rubio and Democratic Senator Bob Menendez, both longtime critics of the CCP and key supporters of US legislation targeting China over its actions against Hong Kong's autonomy.

In short, the emergence of the alliance indicates "there is growing backlash against China’s increasing assertiveness.” In view of the human rights abuses and the intimidation of democratic nations, democratic legislators such as Reinhard Bütikofer felt they "cannot return to business as normal." For many, this decision came with a sense of shame that the free world had been "naive" in its approach to China, that, as Duncan Smith put it, there had been an "unfounded" hope that free markets would lead Beijing to democratic reforms.

Purpose 

The alliance appears to have a defensive posture, seeing China's relationship to the world, at least under Communist Party general secretary Xi Jinping, as being a threat to many democratic values. Overall, the group aims "to help counter what they say is the threat China’s growing influence poses to global trade, security and human rights." The Inter-Parliamentary Alliance on China has a five-fold mission:

1. Safeguarding international rules-based order 
In the aftermath of World War II global institutions were formed, chiefly the United Nations, the World Bank and the International Monetary Fund so that international questions, from trading arrangements to the recognition of territorial borders, are settled according to agreed rules, rather than mere force. Members of the alliance, such as Mike Gallagher of the United States, are concerned that China is undermining the rules based order, with, for example, "illegitimate efforts to build and militarize islands in the region."

2. Upholding of human rights 

Many members are driven by their concern for what they see as China's "egregious human rights violations". — to use the phrase of British member, David Alton — especially towards its own minority groups, particularly Uyghurs and Tibetan people. Canadian member Dan Albas has expressed concerns about the Chinese Government's "crackdowns on legitimate protests and concentration camps for Uighur Muslims." Similarly, Fabian Molina has moved in the Swiss legislature that "Stop crimes against humanity in Xinjiang or suspend free trade with China." Founding co-chair Baroness Kennedy has a particular concern for the poor treatment of lawyers and human rights defenders in China. Some members are hopeful that new instruments for holding China to account on its human rights abuses will emerge. Lianchao Han (a fellow of the Hudson Institute) and Jianli Yang (a survivor of Tiananmen Square) described the formation of the alliance as "a significant step toward confronting China collectively on its human rights abuses and other important issues."

3. Promoting trade fairness 

The activity of selling goods in order to eliminate or damage a competitor is considered "dumping." Currently many members of the alliance see China as engaging in dumping in their own home markets.

4. Strengthening security 
For several founding co-chairs, such as Australia's Andrew Hastie, China's actions on the world stage, particularly in the South China Sea have revealed the regime to be "revisionist and expansionist"  revisionist China is a test of "our alliances and our security like no other time." For co-chair Gen Nakatani (a former Minister of Defence in Japan) the activity of the People's Liberation Army in the region being "dangerous actions" that have a direct "impact on our national security."

5. Protecting national integrity 

Members of the alliance, including Germany's Margarete Bause, are seeing China as attempting to "encroach" on their democratic systems. Several member nations, such as Australia and Sweden, have experienced China actively seeking to influence their institutions, such as Norway's awarding of its Nobel prize to Liu Xiaobo, Sweden's awarding Gui Minhai, or the Australian Labor Party receiving cash donations from patrons connected to the United Front Work Department and its affiliates.  Preserving national integrity means preventing CCP attempts at interference in the running of national institutions such as parliaments and the media. Hence their stated principle that, "Democratic states must maintain the integrity of their political systems, and actively seek to preserve a marketplace of ideas free from distortion."

Campaigns

Treatment of Uyghurs in Xinjiang 
Members of the Alliance have been leading calls for political action in response to the ongoing human rights abuses in the Xinjiang-Uyghur Autonomous Region, which include the forced internment of over one million Uyghurs and other Turkic Muslims in "re-education camps" and the ongoing Uyghur genocide. The campaign was launched after the Associated Press documented a report by Professor Adrian Zenz which focused on a Chinese Government birth prevention programme in Xinjiang.

IPAC co-chairs signed a joint statement in response to the revelations calling for a United Nations led investigation into the alleged atrocities. The statement was followed up by interventions from members of the Alliance in the European Parliament, the Italian Senate, the British House of Commons and the United States Congress.

Hong Kong National Security Law 
The passing of the National Security Law in Hong Kong was met with severe condemnation and calls to action from members of the Alliance. A joint statement from the co-chairs of the Alliance called for an international “lifeboat” scheme for Hong Kong citizens at risk of political persecution, and for countries to “review and recalibrate” relations with China in order to reduce “strategic dependency”.

In a coordinated bi-partisan response IPAC members Senator Marco Rubio, Senator Bob Menendez, Representative Mike Gallagher and Representative Joaquin Castro introduced the Hong Kong Safe Harbor Act in both chambers of the US Congress.

IPAC members also made public statements on the issue in Australia, the European Union, Italy, Japan, Lithuania and the United Kingdom.

No Extradition to Hong Kong 
The Alliance is coordinating efforts to call for no extradition to Hong Kong, where it claims the rule of law is severely compromised following the passing of the National Security Law.

The campaign saw quick success as Australia and Canada suspended their extradition treaties with Hong Kong. New Zealand, the United Kingdom and the United States have announced a review of extradition arrangements in response to the campaign.

Push to boycott Beijing 2022 
On 20 August 2020, Iain Duncan Smith gave a radio interview in London and raised doubts about the UK being able to participate in the 2022 Winter Olympic Games, due to be hosted by Beijing. "China has broken all the rules on free markets, subsidising huge businesses like Huawei, driven other businesses in the free world out of business... they are threatening Australia with sanctions and bullying them because they asked for an independent review on COVID-19 in China. If you add to that the concentration camps and the terrible human rights abuses in Hong Kong, you ask yourself the question, how do you get the point across that no country can behave like this?"Four weeks later, 160 human rights groups wrote a letter to the chief of the International Olympic Committee asking it to consider China's poor human rights record — and revise its decision to let Beijing host the 2022 Winter Games. On 22 September 2020, speaking as the co-chair of the Inter-Parliamentary Alliance on China, Duncan Smith made a more assertive statement asking the IOC to think again about allowing China to hosting the games, addressing China with the words: "The free world does have a strong position to say the bullying, the threatening, the internal repression, the border disputes, the arrogant attitude to your neighbours, the breaking of the treaty with Hong Kong — these must have consequences."

Revealing forced labor in Tibet 

On 22 September 2020, the Alliance co-published a report by Professor Adrian Zenz describing an apparent widespread system of forced labor in the Tibetan Autonomous Region perpetrated by the Chinese government. The co-chairs released a joint statement in which they call upon their governments to take immediate action to condemn the atrocities and to prevent further human rights abuses.

Introducing Magnitsky laws to target CCP officials 

In March 2021, the European Union joined Britain and Canada to introduce sanctions on Chinese government officials, as a response to the persecution of Uyghurs. The joint action was publicly endorsed by the UK's foreign secretary Dominic Raab who said "we are sending the clearest message to the Chinese government that the international community will not turn a blind eye to such serious and systemic human rights violations." The sanctions involving travel bans and asset freezes, were levelled against the leadership of the Public Security Bureau of the Xinjiang Production and Construction Corps including Zhu Hailun and Wang Junzheng. The new law was strongly supported by I-PAC and, in turn, it was announced, China retaliated by sanctioning European MPs who are members of the alliance.

Genocide amendment 
In September 2020, Sir Iain Duncan Smith, who is "convinced that the Chinese government was 'performing the systematic eradication of the Uighur people'", said that the IPAC had "proposed an amendment to (a UK) trade bill which states that if it is deemed that a country is practicing genocide then the trade arrangements with that country should not stand". By March 2021, the initiative was causing a rebellion in the Conservative Party, where many MPs joined opposition members to support the amendment.

Membership 

The alliance states that its goal is to promote and protect democracy globally, it has been described as "one of the most geographically and politically diverse coalitions ever." The founding 18 members of the alliance came from the legislatures of eight nations, Australia, Canada, Germany, Japan, Norway, Sweden, the United Kingdom, the United States as well as the European Parliament.

Within a week of its launch, the number of members had increased from 18 to over 100 lawmakers. With members of the New Zealand, the Netherlands, Lithuanian, Swiss, Ugandan, Belgian, Czech, French, Italian and Danish legislatures joining, the total number of democratic nations in the alliance has increased from 8 to 19, including all five of the Five Eyes security alliance. Each nation is represented in the Alliance by two co-chairs, senior politicians who lead the Alliance's work in that nation.

In a statement, the founding co-chairs said: China under the rule of the Chinese Communist party represents a global challenge... When countries have stood up for the values and human rights, they have done so alone, sometimes, at great cost. No country should have to shoulder this burden alone.... The Inter-Parliamentary Alliance on China has been created to promote a coordinated response between democratic states to challenges posed by the present conduct and future ambitions of the People’s Republic of China. By developing a common set of principles and frameworks that transcend domestic party divisions and international borders, our democracies will be able to keep the rules-based and human rights systems true to their founding purposes. The formation of the alliance was dismissed by the government of the People's Republic of China with its representative in London, Chen Wen, saying, “It's a misinterpretation of China’s foreign policy and a misreading of the current world situation. China is a force for positive change.”

The work of the Alliance membership is supported in an operational capacity by a team comprising the Central Secretariat. This is led by Luke de Pulford, co-founder of the Arise Foundation and Coalition for Genocide Response. A number of individuals act as advisors to the Alliance, including Anne-Marie Brady, Wei Jingsheng, Rahima Mahmut and Robert Suettinger.

Criticism

Criticism of the alliance by the Chinese Communist Party 
The alliance has been the target of criticism from Chinese Communist Party-affiliated sources. Geng Shuang, a spokesman for the Chinese Foreign Ministry, has criticized the group, saying in a press conference that "[w]e urge this handful of politicians to respect facts and basic norms of international relations, discard their Cold War mentality and ideological prejudice, and stop exploiting various issues to interfere in China's internal affairs and political manipulation for selfish gains. We hope that they will find ways to contribute constructively to international solidarity and cooperation."

Criticism of the alliance by others 
The Express Tribune, a Pakistani newspaper, published an opinion piece criticizing the alliance, in which the author wrote that its formation "is an attempt to divide the world and thus pressure the member countries’ other international partners such as India to choose a side, preferably their own." The piece also alleged that the alliance was formed for financial reasons, as it states that "[a] “new cold war” could be just as, if not more, profitable for their influential military–industrial complexes as the original one was. Given the economic crisis that the COVID-19 global pandemic caused in the countries represented in the IPAC, their anti-Chinese politicians might be interested in having their military-industrial complexes attempt to take the lead in reviving their economies at the expense of other industries."

See also
 Human rights in China
Blue Dot Network
Alliance of Democracies

References

External links 

 

Geopolitical rivalry
2020 in international relations
China–United States relations
Australia–China relations
China–European Union relations
China–Japan relations
Democracy promotion
Canada–China relations
China–United Kingdom relations
China–Norway relations
China–Sweden relations
China–Lithuania relations
China–Germany relations
China–Czech Republic relations
China–Netherlands relations